Ngarkat Conservation Park is a protected area located in South Australia's south-eastern corner about  south east of the Adelaide city centre. 

The conservation park was proclaimed in 1979 "to conserve the mallee heath habitat of the 90 Mile Desert". 
On 27 May 2004, the following conservation parks which adjoined the boundaries of the Ngarkat Conservation Park were incorporated into the  conservation park and then abolished  - 
Mount Rescue Conservation Park, Mount Shaugh Conservation Park and Scorpion Springs Conservation Park.  

The conservation park is classified as an IUCN Category Ia protected area.

The conservation park occupies in land in a number of gazetted localities with the majority being in Ngarkat and the remainder being in Parilla, Parrakie and Pinnaroo.

See also
 Ngarkat Highway
 Wyperfeld, Big Desert and Ngarkat Important Bird Area
 Mallee emu-wren

References

External links
Ngarkat Conservation Park official webpage
 Ngarkat Conservation Park  webpage on protected planet

Conservation parks of South Australia
Protected areas established in 1979
1979 establishments in Australia
Murray Mallee
Limestone Coast